Paroxypropione, also known as paraoxypropiophenone, is a synthetic nonsteroidal estrogen which has been used medically as an antigonadotropin in Spain and Italy but appears to no longer be marketed. It was first synthesized in 1902. The antigonadotropic properties of the drug were discovered in 1951 and it entered clinical use shortly thereafter.

Pharmacology

Pharmacodynamics
Paroxypropione is closely related structurally to p-hydroxybenzoic acid and parabens such as methylparaben, and also bears a close resemblance to diethylstilbestrol (which, in fact, produces paroxypropione as an active metabolite) and alkylphenols like nonylphenol, all of which are also estrogens. The drug possesses relatively low affinity for the estrogen receptor and must be given at high dosages to achieve significant estrogenic and antigonadotropic effects, for instance, 0.8 to 1.6 g/day. It possesses 0.1% of the estrogenic activity and less than 0.5% of the antigonadotropic potency of estrone.

Chemistry

Synthesis
The highest reported yield, approximately 96%, is from the between phenol and propionyl chloride. The mechanism is likely to involve initial esterification to give phenyl propionate, which then undergoes a Fries rearrangement.

Derivatives
Paroxypropione is a precursor in the chemical synthesis of diethylstilbestrol and dienestrol.

Society and culture

Names
Brand names Frenantol, Frenormon, Hypophenon, Paroxon, Possipione, Profenone, numerous others; former developmental code name NSC-2834), also known as paroxypropiophenone (P.O.P.) or 4'-hydroxypropiophenone.

Research
Paroxypropione was studied and used in the treatment of breast cancer.

References

Further reading 
 

Abandoned drugs
Antigonadotropins
Antioxidants
Aromatic ketones
Synthetic estrogens
Substances discovered in the 1900s